Qal'eh Bozi is a complex of caves sites located about  south-southwest of Isfahan, Iran; northeast of Dizicheh and north of Hassanabad.

Following the cave site's discovery three seasons of archaeological excavation have been undertaken there, the most recent in 2008. They discovered that the Qaleh Bozi caves attracted human groups due to proximity to freshwater in the form of a permanent river, good solar exposure in cold seasons, and the variety of landscape types (such as cliffs, slopes and plains), which promoted diversity of hunting game and plants.

References

 Biglari, F 2008. Qaleh Bozi Caves. A brochure, Iranian Cultural Heritage, Handicrafts, and Tourism Organization, Archaeology office, Esfahan Province

 Biglari F, M. Javeri, M. Mashkour, Y. Yazdi, S. Shidrang, M. Tengberg, and K. Taheri and J. Darvish 2009. Test excavations at the Middle Paleolithic sites of Qaleh Bozi, Southwest of Central Iran, A preliminary report, In: M. Otte, F. Biglari, and J. Jaubert (eds), Iran Palaeolithic. pp. 29–38, Proceedings of the XV World Congress UISPP, Lisbonne, Vol. 28, BAR International Series 1968.

 Biglari, F. (2014) Typo-technological analysis of the Late Middle Paleolithic bifacial industry of Qaleh Bozi Rockshelter, Central Iran, in Replacement of Neanderthals by Modern Humans: Testing Evolutionary Models of Learning, Edited by Takeru Akazawa & Yoshihiro Nishiaki, pp. 48-50, RNMH Project Series, Tokyo

 Jaubert, J., F. Biglari, R, Crassard, M. Mashkour, W. Rendu and S. Shidrang, 2010, Paléolithique moyen récent de la grotte de Qaleh Bozi 2 (Esfahan, Iran): premiers résultats de la campagne 2008, Iranian Archaeology, Vol.1, No.1, pp. 21-31, Tehran

 Shabani, M., Darvish, J., Mashkour, M., Ghasemzadeh, F. and Mirshamsi, O., 2010. Contemporary and sub-fossil house mice (Mus musculus Linnaeus, 1758)(Rodentia: Muridae) from Iran. Iranian Journal of Animal Biosystematics (IJAB), Vol. 6, No. 2, 45-54

 Claud, E., F. Biglari, and J. Jaubert, 2012, Preliminary use-wear analysis of several Middle Paleolithic points from Qaleh Bozi 3 rockshelter, Central Iran, Iranian Archaeology, Vol.3: 7-13

 Biglari, F., 2014. Typo-technological analysis of the Late Middle Paleolithic bifacial industry of Qaleh Bozi Rockshelter, Central Iran, in Replacement of Neanderthals by Modern Humans: Testing Evolutionary Models of Learning, Edited by Takeru Akazawa & Yoshihiro Nishiaki, pp. 48-50, RNMH Project Series, Tokyo

 Cucchi, Thomas, Katerina Papayianni, Sophie Cerso, Laetitia Aznar-Cormano, Antoine Zazzo, Régis Debruyne, Rémi Berthon, Adrian Bălășescu, Alan Simmons, François Valla, Yannis Hamilakis, Fanis Mavridis, Marjan Mashkour, Jamshid Darvish, Roohollah Siahsarvi, Fereidoun Biglari, Cameron A. Petrie, Lloyd Weeks, Alireza Sardari, Sepideh Maziar, Christiane Denys, David Orton, Emma Jenkins, Melinda Zeder, Jeremy B. Searle, Greger Larson, François Bonhomme, Jean-Christophe Auffray, Jean-Denis Vigne (2020). Tracking the Near Eastern origins and European dispersal of the western house mouse, Scientific Reports, 19 May 2020. DOI: 10.1038/s41598-020-64939-9

External links
 http://sites.google.com/site/fbiglari/qalehboziproject

Sasanian castles
Archaeological sites in Iran
Castles in Iran
Former populated places in Iran
Geography of Isfahan Province
Prehistoric Iran
History of Isfahan Province
Caves of Iran
Landforms of Isfahan Province
Buildings and structures in Isfahan Province
National works of Iran
Prehistory